Konstanty Pociejkewicz (1932–2003) was an international speedway rider from Poland.

Speedway career 
Pociejkewicz was the champion of Poland, winning the Polish Individual Speedway Championship in 1960.

References 

1932 births
2003 deaths
Polish speedway riders